Mikey is a 1992 American psychological slasher film directed by Dennis Dimster and written by Jonathan Glassner. It stars Brian Bonsall as Mikey, a young boy adopted by a family, who turns out to be a violent psychopath.

Plot
A young boy is setting fire to newspapers in the basement. His name is Mikey and he has a younger sister, Beth, whom he blames for the fire when his foster mother admonishes Mikey.

When Mikey is disciplined by his foster mother for starting the fire, he responds by causing Beth to drown in the pool, electrocuting his foster mother while she is in the bath, and killing his foster father with a baseball bat. Mikey avoids suspicion because he is only nine and he tells the police that an intruder killed the family. Detective Reynolds is assigned to the case and he does not suspect Mikey.

A psychiatrist recommends that Mikey get fostered as soon as possible. His foster mother's sister is put forward as a prospective foster carer, but she does not want anything to do with Mikey. She states that he was adopted and that it was suspected that he was abused by members of his family. She does not present as somebody who is overly interested in taking care of a young child.

He is then sent to a new family, Neil and Rachel Trenton, who do not know anything about Mikey's past. Mikey presents himself as an amiable and loving child. For example, when he first meets his foster parents he asks, 'Are you going to be my new mommy and daddy?' At first, he does not behave as if he is disturbed and he exhibits caring behavior towards his new mother's fish. He also manifests behavior which is not out of the ordinary in his desire to succeed in a game which his class at school plays.

Mikey then falls in love with his new best friend, Ben's older sister, Jessie. She is not interested in him as she is 10 years older than Mikey and is dating a young man named David. In an attempt to make Jessie love him, he electrocutes David while he is in a Jacuzzi. After this fails and he is found out by his foster mother, he fatally stabs her with a glass shard, then kills his school's principal and teacher with a bow and arrow and slingshot when they arrive shortly afterward to investigate their suspicions, and unsuccessfully tries to shoot Jessie with a bow. To avoid being blamed, Mikey fakes his own death staging a skeleton of a boy the same age as him at the dining table then blows up the house with a gas leak and Molotov cocktail when his foster dad arrives home to find everyone dead around the table. The skeleton was located in one of Mikey's classrooms at school. Jessie is told by the authorities that Mikey is dead. Later, Mikey going by the name "Josh" is adopted by another family.

Cast
 Brian Bonsall as Michael "Mikey" Holt
 Josie Bissett as Jessie Owens
 Ashley Laurence as Shawn Gilder
 John Diehl as Neil Trenton
 Mimi Craven as Rachel Trenton
 Whitby Hertford as Ben Owens
 Lyman Ward as Mr. Jenkins
 David Rogge as David
 Mark Venturini as Detective Jack Reynolds
 Laura Robinson as Grace Calvin (last name revealed within a newspaper article in the film as "Kelvin")
 Steve Hart as Harold Calvin (last name revealed within a newspaper article in the film as "Kelvin")
 Keeley Marie Gallagher as Beth Calvin (last name revealed within a newspaper article in the film as "Kelvin")
 Lorenzo Obias as New Adoptive Father

UK ban
In the United Kingdom, the film was submitted to the BBFC for a video certificate around the time of the James Bulger murder in Liverpool in 1993. The BBFC, under strict head censor James Ferman, extensively deliberated over whether to pass the film, worrying that it would be targeted in the media furore over video violence, stemming from press reports that the two boys responsible for Bulger's murder had been inspired by a rented video of Child's Play 3.

The BBFC eventually called in child psychologists and police to view the film; the child psychologists deemed it potentially harmful to impressionable young viewers, such as those who murdered Bulger. Cuts to reduce the impact of the strongest scenes were felt to make little impact on the film as a whole. By 1996, the distributor's rights to release the film were about to run out and, under pressure to make a decision, the BBFC were forced to reject the film. The details page for the film references the James Bulger case, the ban and the fact the film remains unrated by the BBFC.

Reception

TV Guide panned the movie, which they felt was directed with "negligible flair" and had a "horrifying but implausible story". Allmovie also panned Mikey, rating it at one and a half stars out of five. In recent years, websites such as JoBlo.com have given it favorable reviews, citing it as somewhat of a cult classic for its straight forward plot points and overall merit in the horror genre.

See also
 Video nasty

References

External links
 
 

1992 films
1990s crime films
American independent films
Films about orphans
American serial killer films
Films about juvenile delinquency
Fratricide in fiction
1990s English-language films
1990s American films